David Gunnarsson (born February 20, 1994) is a Swedish professional ice hockey center. He is currently playing with Örnsköldsviks HF of Division 1. He formerly played in the top tier  Swedish Hockey League (SHL) with Modo Hockey.

Gunnarsson made his Elitserien (now the SHL) debut playing with Modo Hockey during the 2012–13 Elitserien season.

References

External links

1994 births
Living people
Swedish ice hockey centres
Modo Hockey players
Timrå IK players